Eureka is a city in western McPherson County, South Dakota, United States, that is near the North Dakota state line. The population was 813 at the 2020 census.

History
Eureka was laid out in 1887, and named "Eureka", a Greek exclamation meaning "I have found it!"

Geography
Eureka is located at  (45.769069, -99.621953).

Eureka has been assigned the ZIP code 57437 and the FIPS place code 20180.

Climate

Demographics

2010 census
As of the census of 2010, there were 868 people, 452 households, and 240 families living in the city. The racial makeup of the city was 98.2% White, 0.2% Asian, and 1.6% from two or more races. Hispanic or Latino people of any race were 1.2% of the population.

There were 452 households, of which 13.9% had children under the age of 18 living with them, 43.6% were married couples living together, 6.2% had a female householder with no husband present, 3.3% had a male householder with no wife present, and 46.9% were non-families. 45.4% of all households were made up of individuals, and 31.4% had someone living alone who was 65 years of age or older. The average household size was 1.80 and the average family size was 2.45.

The median age in the city was 63.5 years. 13.2% of residents were under the age of 18; 2.3% were between the ages of 18 and 24; 9.6% were from 25 to 44; 27.3% were from 45 to 64; and 47.6% were 65 years of age or older. The gender makeup of the city was 43.5% male and 56.5% female.

2000 census
As of the census of 2000, there were 1,101 people, 528 households, and 296 families living in the city. The population density was 1,178.5 people per square mile (457.1/km2). There were 625 housing units at an average density of 669.0 per square mile (259.5/km2). The racial makeup of the city was 99.00% White, 0.36% Native American, 0.27% Asian, and 0.36% from two or more races.

There were 528 households, out of which 15.5% had children under the age of 18 living with them, 50.6% were married couples living together, 3.4% had a female householder with no husband present, and 43.9% were non-families. 41.7% of all households were made up of individuals, and 29.2% had someone living alone who was 65 years of age or older. The average household size was 1.96 and the average family size was 2.64.

In the city, the population was spread out, with 15.5% under the age of 18, 4.4% from 18 to 24, 14.7% from 25 to 44, 20.0% from 45 to 64, and 45.4% who were 65 years of age or older. The median age was 61 years. For every 100 females, there were 81.4 males. For every 100 females age 18 and over, there were 80.9 males.

The median income for a household in the city was $19,826, and the median income for a family was $30,956. Males had a median income of $23,194 versus $17,000 for females. The per capita income for the city was $13,379. About 11.4% of families and 15.9% of the population were below the poverty line, including 6.5% of those under age 18 and 22.7% of those age 65 or over.

Transportation
Eureka Municipal Airport is a city-owned, public-use airport located two nautical miles (4 km) north of the central business district of Eureka. It is also served by two state highways:

Notable people

 Alice Bauer, former professional golfer, co-founder of the LPGA.
 Marlene Bauer Hagge, former professional golfer, winner of 26 LPGA Tour events, co-founder of the LPGA.
 Charles N. Herreid, Fourth Governor of South Dakota, Republican
 Charles Hoffman,  American politician and Republican member of the South Dakota House of Representatives.
 Dean O. Mehlhaff, former American politician and Republican member of South Dakota house of representatives.
 Al Neuharth, founder of USA Today, former chairman of Gannett Corp.
 Kitty O'Neil, former Hollywood stuntwoman and former landspeed recordholder
 Bill Scherr, former U.S. Olympic wrestler, bronze medalist in 1988 Summer Olympics.
 Jim Scherr, former U.S. Olympic wrestler and former U.S. Olympic Committee CEO.
V. J. Smith, American politician, author, and motivational speaker.

See also
 List of cities in South Dakota

References

External links

 

Cities in South Dakota
Cities in McPherson County, South Dakota